SA is Ami Suzuki's debut album released under label Sony Music Japan on 25 March 1999.

Background information
The album was released on March 25, 1999, through True Kiss Disc, former sub-label of Sony Music Japan dedicated exclusively to artists produced by Tetsuya Komuro. The album was then released on MiniDisc format on April 29, 1999. Its title comes from Suzuki's initials.

The album also received the "Pop Album of the Year" award at the 14th Japan Gold Disc Awards.

A digitally remastered version of the album was subsequently released on Blu-spec CD format on September 11, 2013, simultaneously with her second album Infinity Eighteen Vol. 1.

Chart performance
The album topped the Oricon charts, sold over 2.5 million copies and achieved platinum status by the Recording Industry Association of Japan.

Track listing

Singles

References

Ami Suzuki albums
1999 debut albums
Albums produced by Tetsuya Komuro